1925 Polish Football Championship was the 5th edition of the Polish Football Championship (Non-League) and 4th completed season ended with the selection of a winner. The championship was decided in final tournament played among nine teams (winners of the regional A-Class championship) participated in the league which was divided into 3 groups: an Eastern, a Northern and a Southern one. The winners of each groups, Pogoń Lwów, Warta Poznań and Wisła Kraków, played a Final Group tournament. The champions were Pogoń Lwów, who won their 3rd Polish title.

The championships were held after a one-year break, as the 1924 Polish Championships were abandoned due to the preparations of the Poland national team to participate in the 1924 Olympic Football Tournament.

Competition modus
The final tournaments started on 29 March 1925 and concluded on 30 August 1925 (spring-autumn system). In each of groups the season was played as a round-robin tournament. A total of 9 teams participated. Each team played a total of 4 matches, half at home and half away, two games against each other team. Teams received two points for a win and one point for a draw. The winners of each groups played a Final Group tournament for the title.

Final tournament tables

Eastern Group

Northern Group

Southern Group

Additional Playoff Match

Final Group

Top goalscorers

References

Bibliography

External links
 Poland – List of final tables at RSSSF 
 List of Polish football championships 
 List of Polish football championships 

Polish Football Championship, 1925
Polish
Polish
Seasons in Polish football competitions